"Wannabe" is a 1996 song by the Spice Girls.

It may also refer to:

Film and TV
 Wannabes (film), a 2000 crime drama
 The Wannabes, a 2003 Australian comedy film
 Wannabe (film), a 2005 comedy
 The Wannabe, a 2015 American drama written and directed by Nick Sandow

Television
 Wannabe (TV series), a British television reality series
 The Wannabes (TV series), an American sitcom
 "Wannabe" (CSI: Miami), the 18th episode of the 2003/04 season
 "Wannabe" (D:TNG episode), a 2002 episode of Degrassi: The Next Generation

Music
 "Wannabe" (Itzy song), 2020
 "Wannabe", a 2014 song by FEMM from the album Femm-Isation
Wanna Be (single album), by AOA, 2012
 "Wanna Be", a 2007 song by Dizzee Rascal from the album Maths + English

Other uses
 Wannabes (online game), an interactive game created by Illumna Digital
 Wannabe: A Hollywood Experiment, Jamie Kennedy's autobiography